Al(l)an Qua(r)termain(e) may refer to:

 Allan Quatermain, a fictional character, the protagonist in the novel King Solomon's Mines
Allan Quatermain (novel), an 1887 novel by H. Rider Haggard
Alan Quartermaine (General Hospital), a character on the soap opera General Hospital
Allan Quartermaine (1888–1978), British civil engineer
Alan Quartermaine (footballer) (born 1951), Australian rules footballer who played for East Perth Football Club
Allan Quartermain (footballer) (1913–1985), Australian rules footballer

See also 
Allan Quatermain and the Lost City of Gold, a 1986 film based on the character in King Solomon's Mines and its sequels
Allan Quatermain and the Temple of Skulls, another film based on the same character